Ruchira Kamboj (born 3 May 1964) is an Indian Foreign Service officer of the 1987 batch, who currently serves as India's Permanent Representative to the United Nations since August 2022. She has previously served as High Commissioner of India to South Africa, First female Indian Ambassador to Bhutan and Ambassador/Permanent Representative of India to UNESCO, Paris. She was the All India women's topper of the 1987 Civil Services batch and the topper of the 1987 Foreign Service batch.

On 21 June 2022, Kamboj was appointed as the Ambassador/Permanent Representative - designate of India to the United Nations in New York. Her appointment makes her the first female Permanent Representative of India to the United Nations. She assumed charge as PR-designate on 1 August 2022.

Career
She began her diplomatic journey in Paris, France, where she was posted as the Third Secretary in the Indian Embassy to France from 1989-1991. During this period, she studied French then served as Second Secretary in the Indian Embassy to France. She then returned to Delhi where she worked as Under Secretary in the Europe West Division of India's Ministry of External Affairs from 1991–96, dealing with France, UK, the BENELUX countries, Italy, Spain and Portugal. In this capacity, she also handled India's relationship with the Commonwealth of Nations, representing the country at the 14th Commonwealth Heads of Government Meeting in October 1995 at Auckland, New Zealand.

From 1996-1999, she served in Mauritius as First Secretary (Economic and Commercial) and Head of Chancery at the Indian High Commission in Port Louis. She was closely associated with the State Visit of Prime Minister Deve Gowda to Mauritius in 1998 as well as the State Visit of Prime Minister IK Gujral to South Africa in 1997 when she was sent on special duty to South Africa to assist with this visit.

Returning to Delhi, she served as Deputy Secretary and later Director in charge of Foreign Service Personnel and Cadre in the Ministry of External Affairs from June 1999 until March 2002, one of the longest serving tenures in this key administration post at the Ministry.

United Nations, New York
Ruchira Kamboj was then posted as Counsellor at India's Permanent Mission to the United Nations in New York from 2002-2005, where she dealt with a wide range of political issues, including UN Peacekeeping, UN Security Council reform, the Middle East crisis etc. Upon release of Secretary General Kofi Annan's Blue Ribbon Panel Report in December 2014, she was part of the G-4 team that worked on the reform and expansion of the United Nations Security Council, which is yet a work in progress.

From 2006-2009, she was India's Consul General in Cape Town, South Africa which position involved close liaison with the Parliament of South Africa. In this period, she also steered the visits of the President of India to Cape Town in 2008 and the visit of the President of the Congress Party to Cape Town in 2007, which visit was accorded the status of a State Visit by the Government of South Africa.

Commonwealth Secretariat, London
Ruchira Kamboj was picked to be the Deputy Head of the Office of the Secretary General at the Commonwealth Secretariat London. She was among the two Staff Officers of the Commonwealth Secretary General in a multilateral setting, overseeing a wide range of political and economic issues, attending as well in this period the Commonwealth Heads of Government meeting in 2009 at Trinidad and Tobago.

Prime Minister Modi’s Swearing-in Ceremony
In May 2014 she was called in on special assignment to direct the swearing in ceremony of Prime Minister Narendra Modi, which was marked by the presence of Heads of State and Government from the SAARC countries and Mauritius. She resumed her duties in Paris on completion of this special assignment.

Chief of Protocol

From 2011-2014, she was India's Chief of Protocol, the first and only lady so far in Government to have held this position. In this capacity, she directed all outgoing visits of the President of India, the Vice President of India, the Prime Minister of India and the External Affairs Minister of India. She also dealt with all incoming Heads of Government and State to India. As Chief of Protocol, all High Commissioners/Ambassadors to India worked closely with her on day-to-day administration issues including delicate issues surrounding the Vienna Convention on Diplomatic Relations.

As Chief of Protocol, she was involved in the organization of international Summits in India inclusive of the 4th BRICS Summit in New Delhi in 2012 4th BRICS summit the 11th Council of Ministers' Meeting of the Indian Ocean Rim Association at Bangalore, India in 2011.  She also successfully steered the ASEAN India Commemorative Summit in December 2012 marked by the presence of 10 Heads of State and Government in New Delhi. The second edition of the India ASEAN car rally covering 8000 km through 8 Asian countries concluding at Vigyan Bhawan, New Delhi was a highlight of the Summit. The entire organization of the rally was overseen by her. In 2013, she directed the 11th Asia Europe Foreign Ministers' Meeting held at Gurgaon, Haryana which was attended by 52 Foreign Ministers from Asia and Europe with over 1500 participants.

India-Africa Forum Summit – III, 2015
In August and October 2015, she was called back on special assignment to assist in the organisation of the 3rd India Africa Forum Summit held in New Delhi, which was marked by the presence of Heads of State and Government of the 54 member African Union.  During this period she also steered a special programme on the 'Weaves of Benares' showcasing the rich textile tradition of India's spiritual capital, for the benefit of the Distinguished Visitors.

PR of India to UNESCO, Paris
In her third tryst with multilateralism, she was posted as India's Ambassador to UNESCO Paris in April 2014. Kamboj had a stellar three-year stint at UNESCO with many firsts to her credit. In 2016, a historic three Indian sites were added to UNESCO's World Heritage list: Nalanda Mahavihara,  the Capitol Complex of Chandigarh and Khangchendzonga National Park completing a never-accomplished-before hat trick by any country.  Earlier in 2014, she was part of the team that had inscribed Rani ki Vav  The Great Himalayan National Park to the World Heritage List. In 2015, Varanasi and Jaipur were added as India's first Creative Cities in the UNESCO list. In December 2016, she steered India to victory when Yoga was declared as the Intangible Cultural Heritage of Humanity by the 24 member intergovernmental Committee for the Safeguarding of Intangible Cultural Heritage.  In July 2017, she led the effort to inscribe Ahmedabad as India's first World Heritage City, which was accomplished with the full support of the World Heritage Committee of UNESCO.  Under her stewardship, India set up its first ever UNESCO Chair on Gender Equality and Women's Empowerment at the Amrita Vishwavidyapeetham, Kerala. 

In April 2016, she organized an International Conference on the Zero at UNESCO showcasing the great and glorious tradition of India in Mathematics and Science. The Conference was marked by the presence of leading lights in Mathematics from France, the Arab world and India, inclusive of Fields Medallists Professor Manjul Bhargava from Princeton University and Professor Laurent Lafforgue from IHES, France. As a tribute by India to the world of mathematics and science, a bust of ancient Indian mathematician Aryabhata was gifted to UNESCO  and now adorns the principal entrance of the Organisation, serving as a reminder of this unique and historic event.

High Commissioner for India to South Africa and Lesotho
She was appointed as the High Commissioner of India to South Africa in March 2017 and formally assumed charge of this position upon presentation of her credentials to President Jacob Zuma of South Africa on 24 August 2017.  She is concurrently accredited as High Commissioner of India to the Kingdom of Lesotho.

Personal life
Ruchira Kamboj is married to businessman Diwakar Kamboj and has one daughter. Her late father was an Officer in the Indian Army and her mother is a writer-professor (retired) of Sanskrit from the University of Delhi. She speaks three languages: Hindi, English and French.

She has several OpEds to her credit, in different newspapers and magazines, on a diverse range of topics.

References

External links
 https://www.iol.co.za/thepost/gandhis-teachings-needed-indian-high-commissioner-15136510

Living people
Indian civil servants
Ambassadors of India to South Africa
Ambassadors of India to Bhutan
Women writers from Uttar Pradesh
Indian women ambassadors
1964 births
High Commissioners of India to Lesotho